Trench Halt railway station was a station to the northwest of Dudleston Heath, Shropshire, England. The station was opened in 1914 and closed in 1962.

References

Further reading

Disused railway stations in Shropshire
Railway stations in Great Britain opened in 1914
Railway stations in Great Britain closed in 1940
Railway stations in Great Britain opened in 1946
Railway stations in Great Britain closed in 1962
1914 establishments in England
1962 disestablishments in England
Former Cambrian Railway stations